The following is a list of football stadiums in Sierra Leone, ordered by capacity.

See also 
 List of African stadiums by capacity
 List of association football stadiums by capacity

Football stadiums
Sierra Leone